Cucumber is a 2015 British comedy drama television series created by Russell T Davies and aired on Channel 4. Exploring 21st-century gay life, the series focuses on middle-aged Henry Best (Vincent Franklin). Following a disastrous date night with his boyfriend of nine years, Lance Sullivan (Cyril Nri), Henry's old life shatters. He embarks on a new life with unfamiliar rules.

In development since 2006, Cucumber was announced along with E4's companion series Banana, and 4oD's web series Tofu in November 2013. The titles of all three shows come from a scientific study into the male erection, which divided the erection into a hardness scale consisting of tofu, peeled banana, banana, and cucumber. Upon reading the study, Davies remarked that "right there and then, I knew I had my drama".

Cucumber ran for one series. Davies confirmed that Cucumber was a one and done story and would not return for a second series. The show was nominated for the GLAAD Media Award for Outstanding TV Movie or Limited Series.

Development
Cucumber was created by Davies during his tenure as showrunner of Doctor Who. Envisioned as a spiritual sequel to the seminal 1999–2000 Channel 4 series Queer as Folk, More Gay Men, as it was then called, was to focus on middle-aged gay men. It developed from the question, "why are so many gay men glad when we split up?" that his friend Carl Austin had asked him in 2001. The show was initially due to enter production in 2006, but the success of the revival of Doctor Who indefinitely delayed the series. By March 2007, Davies had fleshed out the initial episode.

He explained a pivotal scene in correspondence with journalist Benjamin Cook:

By 2008, Davies had moved to Los Angeles, California. More Gay Men was among the list of series that Davies wanted to produce, along with an American adaptation of Bob & Rose. Cucumber had been picked up by the American cable network Showtime and BBC Worldwide and entered into pre-production in July 2011. Pre-production was suspended a month later after Davies's boyfriend Andrew Smith was diagnosed with a brain tumour. The couple returned to Manchester so Smith could undergo chemotherapy nearer to their families.

Cucumber was later picked up by Channel 4 to be produced by Davies' former colleague Nicola Shindler and the Red Production Company. The show was Davies' first Channel 4 series in over a decade; Davies had an acrimonious dispute with the channel after a decision to green light production on a Queer as Folk spinoff and The Second Coming was reversed by new executive personnel. Former Doctor Who producer Piers Wenger convinced Davies to return to the channel due to the political nature of the show, which had by then been developed conceptually to include sister shows Banana and Tofu. The three series refer to a urological scale of erection hardness, which consists of tofu, peeled banana, banana, and cucumber, which is alluded to in the show's opening narration.

Cast
Vincent Franklin as Henry Best
Cyril Nri as Lance Sullivan
Julie Hesmondhalgh as Cleo Whitaker
Freddie Fox as Freddie Baxter
James Murray as Daniel Coltrane
Fisayo Akinade as Dean Monroe
Ceallach Spellman as Adam Whitaker
Con O'Neill as Cliff Costello
Matthew Bailey as Tomasz
Eleanor Worthington Cox as Molly Whitaker
Darren Lawrence as Raymond
Jamie Zubairi as Max
Letitia Wright as Vivienne Scott
Anjli Mohindra as Veronica Chandra
Adjoa Andoh as Marie

Episodes

Reception
Writing in The Guardian, Sam Wollaston argued that the debut of the Cucumber/Banana/Tofu trilogy was the "television event of the week". He said that despite the show being "gloriously, triumphantly, explicitly gay", he "never once felt left out" as a heterosexual viewer. Mark Lawson said that the show had a wider theme: "the broader genre of respectability meltdown, as Henry is accelerated from smug dullness to scenes featuring police intervention, furious colleagues and social humiliation".

Both Lawson and Theo Merz (writing in the Daily Telegraph) compare the Cucumber trilogy to Davies' Queer as Folk—Lawson argues that while Cucumber and Banana are "notably sexually graphic", the times have changed: "Queer as Folk was made at a time when campaigners were fighting to reduce the age of gay sexual consent from 18 to 16, while Davies' latest shows are screening in an era when men and women can legally marry each other", and therefore the depictions of explicit sexual themes are less likely to offend. Merz agrees, stating that Cucumber and Banana "feel less dangerous, and so less exciting than the earlier Queer as Folk"; Merz also argues that Cucumber has wider latitude to represent more varied gay characters as it is not carrying the burden of being the only show on television representing gay life.

Writing in the Telegraph, Gerard O'Donovan argued that the first episode succeeded ("In terms of comedy it worked brilliantly, the brio and louche wit of Davies' writing bringing a rare energy and grit to the unfolding chaos"). But Michael Hogan, also writing in the Telegraph, said that after watching the third episode, he was "disappointed" and could not find much warmth in the protagonist, Henry.

The series was also positively reviewed in The Independent, where Ellen E. Jones stated: "In Davies' hands, the tragi-comedy of middle-aged desperation is so sad, but so, very, very funny". Jones also argued that the appeal of the show was "universal" rather than just limited to a gay audience.

International broadcasts
Both Cucumber and Banana premiered in the United States on Logo on 13 April 2015 and were watched by 55,000 viewers. Both series aired in Australia on SBS Television. In Canada, Cucumber and Banana were broadcast on OutTV in spring 2015. The series aired in Germany as a dubbed version with the first episode on WDR on 30 July 2016, which was watched by 70,000 viewers.

Notes

References

External links

 

.

2015 British television series debuts
2015 British television series endings
2010s British drama television series
2010s British comedy-drama television series
Channel 4 television dramas
English-language television shows
Television shows written by Russell T Davies
Television shows set in Manchester
2010s British television miniseries
Television series by Red Production Company
Television series created by Russell T Davies
Gay-related television shows
2010s British LGBT-related comedy television series
2010s British LGBT-related television series